The Confederation of University and College Sports Associations (CUCSA) was created under the directive of the supreme council of Sports in Africa Zone IV and cordinates sports in member countries.

History 
The origin of the body can be traced to Lusaka, Zambia and is made up of the National University and the College Sports Association of the Africa Zone VI.

Executive committee 
This is the committee responsible for decision making of the body. The committee is made up of the members elected by the assembly.

Member universities 
These are member universities under the body. They includes; 
 Federação Angolana do Desporto Universitário - Angola
 Botswana Tertiary Student Sports Association - Botswana
 Lesotho University & College Sports Association - Lesotho
 Tertiary Students Sports Association of Malawi - Malawi
 Associacao dos Estudantes Universitarios - Mozambique
 Tertiary Institutes Sports Association of Namibia - Namibia
 University Sport South Africa - South Africa
 Swaziland University & Colleges Sports Association - Swaziland
 Zambia Higher Institutions Sports Association - Zambia
 Zimbabwe Tertiary Institutes Sports Union - Zimbabwe

References 

Sports governing bodies in Africa
Sports organizations established in 1989
1989 establishments in Africa